Tsogtgerel Khutag (born 21 May 1992) is a Mongolian judoka.

He is the silver medallist of the 2016 Judo Grand Prix Qingdao in the -100 kg category.

References

External links
 

1992 births
Living people
Mongolian male judoka